Ji Hun-Min (born March 26, 1984) is a South Korean weightlifter.  He competed in the Men's Featherweight division at the 2008 Beijing Olympic Games.  After placing second after the snatch lift, he failed to successfully lift in the clean and jerk, and hence was disqualified.  The same thing happened at the 2012 Summer Olympics.

References

South Korean male weightlifters
1984 births
Living people
Weightlifters at the 2008 Summer Olympics
Weightlifters at the 2012 Summer Olympics
Olympic weightlifters of South Korea
Weightlifters at the 2006 Asian Games
Weightlifters at the 2010 Asian Games
Asian Games competitors for South Korea
21st-century South Korean people